Amar Singh Chaudhary is an Indian politician and a member of 17th Legislative Assembly of Siddharth Nagar district, Uttar Pradesh of India. He represents the Shohratgarh constituency of Uttar Pradesh and is a member of the Apna Dal (Sonelal) party.

Political career
Chaudhary has been a member of the 17th Legislative Assembly of Uttar Pradesh. Since 2017, he has represented the Shohratgarh constituency and is a member of the AD(S). In 2017 elections he defeated Samajwadi party candidate Jameel Siddiqui by a margin of 22,124 votes.

Posts held

See also
Uttar Pradesh Legislative Assembly

References

Uttar Pradesh MLAs 2017–2022
Apna Dal (Sonelal) politicians
Living people
Year of birth missing (living people)
Samajwadi Party politicians